There are two species of lizard named sandfish skink:
 Scincus scincus
 Scincus conirostris